Hermann Heinrich Ploss (8 February 1819, in Leipzig – 11 December 1885, in Leipzig)  was a German gynecologist and anthropologist. He was full professor at the medical faculty of the University of Leipzig.

He published numerous works on sexual medicine and was considered as one of the founders of the comparative gynecology and pediatrics.

Works 
 Das Weib in der Natur- und Völkerkunde [Woman in Natural History and Folklore]. 2 Volumes. Grieben, Leipzig, 1885.

External links 
 Familienkunde bei www.ploss-online.de 

1819 births
1885 deaths
German gynaecologists
German anthropologists
Physicians from Leipzig
People from the Kingdom of Saxony